"Got Me" is a song released by American record label Dreamville, performed by American singer Ari Lennox and American rapper Omen featuring fellow American singer Ty Dolla $ign and fellow American rapper Dreezy. It was released on June 12, 2019 alongside "Down Bad" as the second singles from the label's third compilation album, Revenge of the Dreamers III (2019).

Background
Under the EP 1-888-88-DREAM, the single was released with "Down Bad" on Wednesday, June 12. The EP’s title is referencing the “1-888-88-DREAM” phone number that Cole used to announce the original Revenge of the Dreamers in 2014. Dreamville representatives used hotline phone number to talk to fans and also play some exclusive tracks from the label's compilation album.

Composition
The song is produced by Deputy, OZ, and MD Beatz. It contains a sample of "Come Over" by Faith Evans from her debut studio album Faith. Although being uncredited, Ari Lennox said Deante' Hitchcock, Vincent Berry, and Yung Baby Tate helped write her verse for the song.

Critical reception
Erika Marie of HotNewHipHop called the song a "sultry R&B jam" and said it "is a song that you can dedicate to that special somebody or groove to when you're cruising around on a hot summer night." The writer continued to mention that it is a nice balance and shows that Revenge of The Dreamers is cooking up an album that will have a little something for everyone."

Credits and personnel
Credits and personnel adapted from Tidal.

 Courtney Shenade Salter – featured artist, composer, lyricist
 Damon Coleman – featured artist, composer, lyricist
 Tyrone Griffin, Jr. – featured artist, composer, lyricist
 Sandrea Sledge – featured artist, composer, lyricist
 Deputy – producer, composer, lyricist
 OZ – producer, composer, lyricist
 MD Beatz – producer, composer, lyricist
 Joi Coleman - composer, lyricist
 Floyd Howard – composer, lyricist
 Faith Evans – composer, lyricist
 Carl Thompson – composer, lyricist
 Joe LaPorta — mastering engineer
 Juru "Mez" Davis — mixer
 Jeff Thompson — recording engineer

Charts

Certifications

References

2019 singles
2019 songs
Ari Lennox songs
Dreamville Records singles
Songs written by Ari Lennox
Songs written by Faith Evans
Songs written by Oz (record producer)
Songs written by Ty Dolla Sign
Ty Dolla Sign songs